The Battle of Paso Cuello took place on 19 March 1817 between forces commanded by Carlos Frederico Lecor, at that time Baron of Laguna, and artiguist forces, that is, followers of the caudillo José Gervasio Artigas, led by Fructuoso Rivera and Miguel Barreiro at Paso Cuello, a small stream that divides the modern day Uruguayan departments of Canelones and Florida. 

Lecor, that had already taken Montevideo by that time, left the city a few days earlier with his forces to attack the oriental encampment at Paso Cuello, where he believed Artigas had made his base.

Notes

References

Citations

Bibliography 
 

Paso Cuello
Passo Cuello
Conflicts in 1817